Government of the Syrian Arab Republic is the union government created by the constitution of Syria whereby the president is the head of state and the prime minister is the head of government. Executive power is exercised by the government. Syria has a legislative council with 250 members. The country has been in a civil war since 2011 against various domestic and foreign forces that oppose both the Syrian government and each other, in varying combinations. The seat of the government is located in Damascus, Syria.

Administration 
The executive branch consists of the president, two vice presidents, the prime minister, and the Council of Ministers (cabinet). The constitution requires the president to be a Muslim.
|President
|Bashar al-Assad
|Ba'ath Party
|17 July 2000
|-
|Prime Minister
|Hussein Arnous
|Ba'ath Party
|11 June 2020
|}

Council of Ministers 

A Council of Ministers, or cabinet, which currently consists of 30 members, perform the day-to-day administrative functions of government.

Legislative branch 

People's Assembly of Syria is Syria's legislative authority. It has 250 members elected for a four-year term in 15 multi-seat constituencies. The new Syrian constitution of 2012 introduced multi-party system without guaranteed leadership of any political party.

Judicial branch 

Syria's judicial branches include the Supreme Constitutional Court, the High Judicial Council, the Court of Cassation, and the State Security Courts. Islamic jurisprudence is a main source of legislation and Syria's judicial system has elements of Ottoman, French, and Islamic laws. Syria has three levels of courts: courts of first instance, courts of appeals, and the constitutional court, the highest tribunal. Religious courts handle questions of personal and family law.

International organization participation 

Syria is a member of the Arab Bank for Economic Development in Africa, Arab Fund for Economic and Social Development, Arab Monetary Fund, Council of Arab Economic Unity, Customs Cooperation Council, Economic and Social Commission for Western Asia, Food and Agriculture Organization, Group of 24, Group of 77, International Atomic Energy Agency, International Bank for Reconstruction and Development, International Civil Aviation Organization, International Chamber of Commerce, International Development Association, Islamic Development Bank, International Fund for Agricultural Development, International Finance Corporation, International Labour Organization, International Monetary Fund, International Maritime Organization, INTELSAT, INTERPOL, International Olympic Committee, International Organization for Standardization, International Telecommunication Union, International Federation of Red Cross and Red Crescent Societies, Non-Aligned Movement, Organization of Arab Petroleum Exporting Countries, Organisation of Islamic Cooperation, United Nations, UN Commission on Human Rights, UN Conference on Trade and Development, UN Industrial Development Organization, UN Relief and Works Agency for Palestine Refugees in the Near East, Universal Postal Union, World Federation of Trade Unions, World Health Organization, World Meteorological Organization, and World Tourism Organization.

Syria's diplomats last sat on the UN Security Council (as a non-permanent member) in December 2003.

See also 
 Politics of Syria

References

External links 

 
 The Syrian Constitution accessed 13 November 2012
 

Government of Syria